Platyjionia is a monotypic moth genus of the family Erebidae. Its only species, Platyjionia mediorufa, is found in the north-eastern Himalayas, Thailand, Peninsular Malaysia, Sumatra and Borneo. Both the genus and species were first described by George Hampson, the genus in 1926 and the species in 1894.

References

Calpinae
Monotypic moth genera